Lobelia winfridae, commonly known as little lobelia, is a small herbaceous plant in the family Campanulaceae native to Western Australia. 

It blooms between August and November producing blue flowers.

The species is found on plains, lateritic screes, dunes and sandstone breakaways in the Mid West, Wheatbelt and Goldfields-Esperance regions of Western Australia where it grows in stony sandy-clay soils.

References

winfridae
Flora of Western Australia
Plants described in 1905